Martin Kennedy may refer to:
Martin Kennedy (composer) (born 1978), English composer of contemporary classical music
Martin Kennedy (hurler) (1898–1983), Irish hurler
Martin Kennedy (Kansas politician)
Martin Kennedy (New Zealand politician) (1836–1916), Member of Parliament from Westland, New Zealand
Martin Kennedy (rugby league) (born 1989), Australian professional rugby league footballer
Martin J. Kennedy (1892–1955), U.S. Representative from New York
Martin Kennedy, a character in Retreat (film)